Cyril II of Jerusalem (original name Konstantinos Kritikos, 1792 – August 18, 1877) was a 19th-century patriarch of Jerusalem.

Cyril was born in 1792 in the island of Samos. In 1816 he was ordained a deacon, then a presbyter, was abbot of the monastery. In 1835 he became Archbishop of Sebasteia and in 1838 of Lydia. In 1845 he was elected as the Greek Orthodox Patriarch of Jerusalem under the name Cyril II (1846–1872) by the Hagiotaphites (Confraternity of the Holy Sepulchre) and remains to 1872. On February 28, 1870, Sultan Abdulaziz signed a firman which created the Bulgarian Exarchate  subjectеd to the Ecumenical Patriarchate  but yet as a representative of the Bulgarian millet in the Ottoman Empire. Cyril II participated in the Council in Constantinople, chaired by Ecumenical Patriarch Anthimus VI, in September 1872, wherein the Patriarchs of Alexandria and Antioch also participated and which on 18/30 September declared the Bulgarian Exarchate as schismatic and its adherents excommunicated. Cyril opposed the declaration of schism and declined to sign the Council's decisions. On September 14, 1872 Cyril II left the council in Constantinople by steamer to Jaffa and Jerusalem. Dethroned from the patriarchal throne on December 12, 1872, in his absence. 
Cyril II had many supporters - especially among Christian Arabs, but also among high-ranking dignitaries, many of whom suffer because of it.  
Cyril's successor on the patriarchal throne, Procopius, remained little more than two years. On February 26, 1875, mainly under the pressure of the Arab population and Orthodox clergy, he was deposed. Arab notables from Jerusalem wanted former patriarch Cyril II to be a candidate for the vacant throne, but in a pastoral message, published in the newspapers, he declined this invitation on grounds of advanced age. He died on August 18, 1877.

External links 
 http://synpress-classic.dveri.bg/21-2002/pKiril.htm
 http://synpress-classic.dveri.bg/21-2002/ubilei.htm
 https://archive.today/20130102142123/http://www.pravoslavie.domainbg.com/03/snegarov/sneg-shizmata-iztoc.html

19th-century Greek people
19th-century Greek Orthodox Patriarchs of Jerusalem
Greeks from the Ottoman Empire
People from Samos
1792 births
1877 deaths